This is a list of city and town halls in the United Kingdom.

 for town halls in England see List of city and town halls in England
 for town halls in Scotland see List of city chambers and town halls in Scotland
 for town halls in Northern Ireland see List of city and town halls in Northern Ireland
 for town halls in Wales see List of city and town halls in Wales

 
United Kingdom